Buckley Park College is a medium-sized, public secondary school located in Essendon, Victoria, Australia. It has around 902 students from year 7 - 12. The current principal of the school is Harold Cheung.

Notable alumni 
Callum Moore, Australian rules footballer
Tash Sultana, musician
Hannah Cross, synchronised swimmer

References

External links
 Buckley Park College homepage

Public high schools in Melbourne
Educational institutions established in 1963
1963 establishments in Australia
Essendon, Victoria
Buildings and structures in the City of Moonee Valley